Bikaner – Haridwar Express is also known as Gita Ganga Express is an Express train belonging to North Western Railway zone of Indian Railways that run between  and  in India.

Background
This train was inaugurated on 2 December 2017, from Haridwar flagged off by Rajen Gohen, State Minister of Railways for direct connectivity between Bikaner and Haridwar.

Service
Frequency of this train is tri-weekly and it covers the distance of 755 km with an average speed of 49 km/h on both sides.

Routes

Traction
As the route is going to be electrified an WDM-3D loco pulls the train to its destination on both sides.

External links
 14717 Bikaner Haridwar Express
 14718 Haridwar Bikaner Express

References

Express trains in India
Rail transport in Rajasthan
Rail transport in Haryana
Transport in Bikaner
Trains from Haridwar